Johnny Cash at Madison Square Garden is a 1969 recording of a Johnny Cash concert at Madison Square Garden.  It was released in 2002.

Description
The album featured Cash and other musicians and singers including W.S. Holland, Marshall Grant, Bob Wootton, the Statler Brothers, Carl Perkins, Tommy Cash and the Carter Family. Absent from the show was Cash's wife June Carter Cash, who was home pregnant with their son John Carter Cash, a fact referenced during the recording.

As with most Cash shows, the genres covered ran the gamut from country music to rockabilly to even some folk rock. Similarly to the extended releases of both the San Quentin and At Folsom Prison that had been made available around the same time, Johnny Cash at Madison Square Garden includes numbers performed by Perkins, the Statlers and the Carters while Johnny was offstage. During this particular show, however, Cash introduced his father Ray and also Shel Silverstein, who wrote Cash's biggest pop hit, "A Boy Named Sue". Silverstein is the subject of some good-natured ribbing by Cash as he performs an uncensored version of "A Boy Named Sue". At the time of the recording, The Johnny Cash Show was in production and a popular TV series; its weekly "Come Along and Ride This Train" segment is referenced in the introduction to "As Long as the Grass Shall Grow."

Track listing
"Big River" (J. Cash) – 2:21
"I Still Miss Someone" (Cash, Roy Cash Jr.) – 1:37
"Five Feet High and Rising" (Cash) – 2:52
"Pickin' Time" (Cash) – 2:36
"Remember the Alamo" (Jane Bowers) – 2:48
"Last Night I Had the Strangest Dream" (Ed McCurdy) – 3:04
"Wreck of the Old 97" (Arranged by Cash, Norman George Blake, Robert Johnson) – 2:14
"The Long Black Veil" (Danny Dill, Marijohn Wilkin) – 3:01
"The Wall" (Harlan Howard) – 1:09
"Send a Picture of Mother" (Cash) – 2:36
"Folsom Prison Blues" (Cash) – 3:35
"Blue Suede Shoes" (C. Perkins) – 3:13 (Carl Perkins)
"Flowers on the Wall" (L. DeWitt) – 2:32 (The Statler Brothers)
"Wildwood Flower" (A.P. Carter) – 3:45 (The Carter Family)
"Worried Man Blues" (A.P. Carter) – 1:40 (The Carter Family)
"A Boy Named Sue" (Shel Silverstein) – 4:25
"Cocaine Blues" (T.J. Arnall) – 1:57
"Jesus was a Carpenter" (C. Wren) – 3:40
"The Ballad of Ira Hayes" (Pete LaFarge) – 3:11
"As Long as the Grass Shall Grow" (LaFarge) – 3:50
"Sing a Traveling Song" (K. Jones) – 3:30
"He Turned the Water into Wine" (Cash) – 3:16
"Were You There (When They Crucifed My Lord)" (Traditional, Arranged by Cash) – 4:16
"Daddy Sang Bass" (Carl Perkins) – 2:15
"Finale Medley" – 4:45:
"Do What You Do, Do Well" (N. Miller) (Tommy Cash & Johnny Cash)
"I Walk the Line" (Cash) (The Carter Family)
"Ring of Fire" (Cash, M. Kilgore) (The Statler Brothers)
"Folsom Prison Blues" (Cash) (Carl Perkins)
"The Rebel - Johnny Yuma" (R. Markowitz, A. Fenady)
"Folsom Prison Blues" (Cash)
"Suppertime" (I. F. Stanphill) – 2:55

Personnel
Johnny Cash - vocal, guitar

Carter Family

Maybelle Carter - vocals, guitar
Robbie Harden - vocals, guitar
Anita Carter - vocals, guitar
Helen Carter - vocals, guitar

The Statler Brothers
Phil Balsley — vocals
Lew DeWitt — vocals
Don Reid — vocals
Harold Reid — vocals

Backing Band

Carl Perkins - electric guitar
Marshall Grant - bass guitar
W.S. Holland - drums
Bob Wootton - electric guitar
Tommy Cash - PA announcer, acoustic guitar, vocals

Additional personnel
Original Recording Produced by: Bob Johnston
Produced for Release by: Al Quaglieri
Mixed By: Thom Cadley at Sony Music Studios, New York
Assistant Engineer: John Hill
Edited and Mastered by: Darcy Proper at Sony Music Studios, New York
Legacy A&R: Steve Berkowitz
Project Designer: John Jackson
A&R Coordination: Darren Salmieru
Art Direction: Howard Frizson
Design: Roxanne Slimark

Charts
Album - Billboard (United States)

References

2002 live albums
Johnny Cash live albums
Albums recorded at Madison Square Garden
Columbia Records live albums